The Dzhagdy Range is a range of mountains in far North-eastern Russia. Administratively it belongs partly to Amur Oblast and partly to the Khabarovsk Krai of the Russian Federation.

Geography
The Dzhagdy is a range in northeastern Siberia, located in the northeast of Amur Oblast and the western side of Khabarovsk Krai. It is part of the Yankan - Tukuringra - Soktakhan - Dzhagdy group of mountain ranges (which also includes the Turan Range), being the easternmost of the group. The Upper Zeya Plain lies between this alignment of ranges and the Stanovoy Range to the north. 

The Dzhagdy Range is limited by the Zeya River valley to the north and west, where Zeya town is located. The Tukuringra Range joins the Soktakhan and the Dzhagdy on the area of the Zeya Dam. To the north flows the Uda River and in the south lies the Zeya-Bureya Lowland. To the southeast the Selemdzha Range continues further eastwards. The highest point of the Dzhagdy is an unnamed peak reaching . The Nora and Orlovka, tributaries of the Selemdzha, have their sources in the range.

Flora and fauna
The slopes of the range are covered by conifer forests, part of the Da Hinggan-Dzhagdy Mountains conifer forests ecoregion, together with the Greater Khingan (Da Hinggan) Range of Manchuria, China. The Zeya Nature Reserve is located at the eastern end of the Tukuringra Range, where it joins the Dzhagdy.

The lower altitudes of the range provide a habitat for the Siberian Salamander.

See also
Northeast Siberian taiga
Palearctic realm
Temperate coniferous forest

References

External links
Gorny Journal, 1905

Mountain ranges of Amur Oblast
Mountain ranges of Khabarovsk Krai
Mountain ranges of Russia